Grace Annie Lockhart (22 February 1855 – 18 May 1916) was the first woman in the British Empire to receive a Bachelor's degree. She formally enrolled in Mount Allison University in Sackville, New Brunswick, Canada in 1874 and graduated with a degree of Bachelor of Science and English Literature on 25 May 1875. Although her later life was spent in a more conventional role, as the wife of the Methodist minister J.L. Dawson, Lockhart's academic achievement as a student provided clear evidence of the justice of women's claim to full rights in the field of higher education.

References

1855 births
1916 deaths
Persons of National Historic Significance (Canada)